The 11th United States Congress was a meeting of the legislative branch of the United States federal government, consisting of the United States Senate and the United States House of Representatives. It met in Washington, D.C. from March 4, 1809, to March 4, 1811, during the first two years of James Madison's presidency. The apportionment of seats in the House of Representatives was based on the 1800 United States census. Both chambers had a Democratic-Republican majority.

Major events

 March 4, 1809: James Madison became President of the United States
 October 27, 1810: Annexation of West Florida from Spain

Major legislation

 May 1, 1810: Macon's Bill Number 2, ch. 39,

Constitutional amendments

 May 1, 1810: Approved an amendment to the United States Constitution that would strip United States citizenship from any citizen who accepted a title of nobility from a foreign country, and submitted it to the state legislatures for ratification 
 This amendment, commonly known as the Titles of Nobility Amendment, has not been ratified and is still pending before the states.

Party summary
The count below identifies party affiliations at the beginning of the first session of this congress. Changes resulting from subsequent replacements are shown below in the "Changes in membership" section.

Senate

House of Representatives

Leadership

Senate 
 President: George Clinton (DR)
 President pro tempore: John Milledge (DR)
 Andrew Gregg (DR), from June 26, 1809
 John Gaillard (DR), from February 28, 1810
 John Pope (DR), from February 23, 1811

House of Representatives 
 Speaker: Joseph B. Varnum (DR)

Members
This list is arranged by chamber, then by state. Senators are listed by class, and representatives are listed by district.
Skip to House of Representatives, below

Senate
Senators were elected by the state legislatures every two years, with one-third beginning new six-year terms with each Congress. Preceding the names in the list below are Senate class numbers, which indicate the cycle of their election. In this Congress, Class 1 meant their term began with this Congress, requiring re-election in 1814; Class 2 meant their term ended with this Congress, requiring re-election in 1810; and Class 3 meant their term began in the last Congress, requiring re-election in 1812.

Connecticut 
 1. James Hillhouse (F), until June 10, 1810
 Samuel W. Dana (F), from December 4, 1810
 3. Chauncey Goodrich (F)

Delaware 
 1. Samuel White (F), until November 4, 1809
 Outerbridge Horsey (F), from January 12, 1810
 2. James A. Bayard (F)

Georgia 
 2. William H. Crawford (DR)
 3. John Milledge (DR), until November 14, 1809
 Charles Tait (DR), from November 27, 1809

Kentucky 
 2. Buckner Thruston (DR), until December 18, 1809
 Henry Clay (DR), from November 4, 1810
 3. John Pope (DR)

Maryland 
 1. Samuel Smith (DR)
 3. Philip Reed (DR)

Massachusetts 
 1. James Lloyd (F)
 2. Timothy Pickering (F)

New Hampshire 
 2. Nicholas Gilman (DR)
 3. Nahum Parker (DR), until June 1, 1810
 Charles Cutts (F), from June 21, 1810

New Jersey 
 1. John Lambert (DR)
 2. Aaron Kitchell (DR), until March 12, 1809
 John Condit (DR), from March 21, 1809

New York 
 1. Obadiah German (DR)
 3. John Smith (DR)

North Carolina 
 2. James Turner (DR)
 3. Jesse Franklin (DR)

Ohio 
 1. Return J. Meigs Jr. (DR), until December 10, 1810, or before
 Thomas Worthington (DR), from December 15, 1810
 3. Stanley Griswold (DR), May 18, 1809 – December 11, 1809
 Alexander Campbell (DR), from December 11, 1809

Pennsylvania 
 1. Michael Leib (DR)
 3. Andrew Gregg (DR)

Rhode Island 
 1. Francis Malbone (F), until June 4, 1809
 Christopher G. Champlin (F), from June 26, 1809
 2. Elisha Mathewson (DR)

South Carolina 
 2. Thomas Sumter (DR), until December 16, 1810
 John Taylor (DR), from December 31, 1810
 3. John Gaillard (DR)

Tennessee 
 1. Joseph Anderson (DR)
 2. Daniel Smith (DR), until March 31, 1809
 Jenkin Whiteside (DR), from April 11, 1809

Vermont 
 1. Jonathan Robinson (DR)
 3. Stephen R. Bradley (DR)

Virginia 
 1. Richard Brent (DR)
 2. William B. Giles (DR)

House of Representatives
The names of members of the House of Representatives are preceded by their districts.

Connecticut 
All representatives were elected statewide on a general ticket.
 . Epaphroditus Champion (F)
 . Samuel W. Dana (F), until May 10, 1810
 Ebenezer Huntington (F), from October 11, 1810
 . John Davenport (F)
 . Jonathan O. Moseley (F)
 . Timothy Pitkin (F)
 . Lewis B. Sturges (F)
 . Benjamin Tallmadge (F)

Delaware 
 . Nicholas Van Dyke (F)

Georgia 
 . William W. Bibb (DR)
 . Howell Cobb (DR)
 . Dennis Smelt (DR)
 . George M. Troup (DR)

Kentucky 
 . Matthew Lyon (DR)
 . Samuel McKee (DR)
 . Henry Crist (DR)
 . Richard M. Johnson (DR)
 . Benjamin Howard (DR), until April 10, 1810
 William T. Barry (DR), from August 8, 1810
 . Joseph Desha (DR)

Maryland 
The 5th district was a plural district with two representatives.
 . John Campbell (F)
 . Archibald Van Horne (DR)
 . Philip B. Key (F)
 . Roger Nelson (DR), until May 14, 1810
 Samuel Ringgold (DR), from October 15, 1810
 . Alexander McKim (DR)
 . Nicholas R. Moore (DR)
 . John Montgomery (DR)
 . John Brown (DR), until sometime in 1810
 Robert Wright (DR), from November 29, 1810
 . Charles Goldsborough (F)

Massachusetts 
 . Josiah Quincy (F)
 . Benjamin Pickman Jr. (F)
 . Edward St. Loe Livermore (F)
 . Joseph Bradley Varnum (DR)
 . William Ely (F)
 . Samuel Taggart (F)
 . William Baylies (F), until June 28, 1809
 Charles Turner Jr. (DR), from June 28, 1809
 . Gideon Gardner (DR)
 . Laban Wheaton (F)
 . Jabez Upham (F), until sometime in 1810
 Joseph Allen (F), from October 8, 1810
 . William Stedman (F), until July 16, 1810
 Abijah Bigelow (F), from October 8, 1810
 . Ezekiel Bacon (DR)
 . Ebenezer Seaver (DR)
 . Richard Cutts (DR)
 . Ezekiel Whitman (F)
 . Orchard Cook (DR)
 . Barzillai Gannett (DR)

New Hampshire 
 . Daniel Blaisdell (F)
 . John C. Chamberlain (F)
 . William Hale (F)
 . Nathaniel A. Haven (F)
 . James Wilson (F)

New Jersey 
 . Adam Boyd (DR)
 . James Cox (DR), until September 12, 1810
 John A. Scudder (DR), from October 31, 1810
 . William Helms (DR)
 . Jacob Hufty (DR)
 . Thomas Newbold (DR)
 . Henry Southard (DR)

New York 
There were two plural districts, the 2nd & 6th, each had two representatives.
 . Ebenezer Sage (DR)
 . William Denning (DR), until sometime before late April 1810
 Samuel L. Mitchill (DR), from December 4, 1810
 . Gurdon S. Mumford (DR)
 . Jonathan Fisk (DR)
 . James Emott (F)
 . Barent Gardenier (F)
 . Herman Knickerbocker (F)
 . Robert Le Roy Livingston (F)
 . Killian K. Van Rensselaer (F)
 . John Thompson (DR)
 . Thomas Sammons (F)
 . John Nicholson (DR)
 . Thomas R. Gold (F)
 . Erastus Root (DR)
 . Uri Tracy (DR)
 . Vincent Mathews (F)
 . Peter B. Porter (DR)

North Carolina 
 . Lemuel Sawyer (DR)
 . Willis Alston (DR)
 . William Kennedy (DR)
 . John Stanly (F)
 . Thomas Kenan (DR)
 . Nathaniel Macon (DR)
 . Archibald McBryde (F)
 . Richard Stanford (DR)
 . James Cochran (DR)
 . Joseph Pearson (F)
 . James Holland (DR)
 . Meshack Franklin (DR)

Ohio 
 . Jeremiah Morrow (DR)

Pennsylvania 
There were four plural districts, the 1st, 2nd, & 3rd had three representatives each, the 4th had two representatives.
 . William Anderson (DR)
 . John Porter (DR)
 . Benjamin Say (DR), until sometime in June 1809
 Adam Seybert (DR), from October 10, 1809
 . Robert Brown (DR)
 . William Milnor (F)
 . John Ross (DR)
 . Daniel Hiester (DR)
 . Robert Jenkins (F)
 . Matthias Richards (DR)
 . David Bard (DR)
 . Robert Whitehill (DR)
 . George Smith (DR)
 . William Crawford (DR)
 . John Rea (DR)
 . William Findley (DR)
 . John Smilie (DR)
 . Aaron Lyle (DR)
 . Samuel Smith (DR)

Rhode Island 
Both representatives were elected statewide on a general ticket.
 . Richard Jackson Jr. (F)
 . Elisha R. Potter (F)

South Carolina 
 . Robert Marion (DR), until December 4, 1810
 Langdon Cheves (DR), from December 31, 1810
 . William Butler Sr. (DR)
 . Robert Witherspoon (DR)
 . John Taylor (DR), until December 30, 1810, vacant thereafter
 . Richard Winn (DR)
 . Joseph Calhoun (DR)
 . Thomas Moore (DR)
 . Lemuel J. Alston (DR)

Tennessee 
 . John Rhea (DR)
 . Robert Weakley (DR)
 . Pleasant M. Miller (DR)

Vermont 
 . Samuel Shaw (DR)
 . Jonathan H. Hubbard (F)
 . William Chamberlain (F)
 . Martin Chittenden (F)

Virginia 
 . John G. Jackson (DR), until September 28, 1810
 William McKinley (DR), from December 21, 1810
 . James Stephenson (F)
 . John Smith (DR)
 . Jacob Swoope (F)
 . James Breckinridge (F)
 . Daniel Sheffey (F)
 . Joseph Lewis Jr. (F)
 . Walter Jones (DR)
 . John Love (DR)
 . John Dawson (DR)
 . John Roane (DR)
 . Burwell Bassett (DR)
 . William A. Burwell (DR)
 . Matthew Clay (DR)
 . John Randolph (DR)
 . John W. Eppes (DR)
 . Thomas Gholson Jr. (DR)
 . Peterson Goodwyn (DR)
 . Edwin Gray (DR)
 . Thomas Newton Jr. (DR)
 . Wilson C. Nicholas (DR), until November 27, 1809
 David S. Garland (DR), from January 17, 1810
 . John Clopton (DR)

Non-voting members 
 . Jonathan Jennings, from November 27, 1809
 . George Poindexter
 . Julien De L. Poydras

Changes in membership
The count below reflects changes from the beginning of the first session of this Congress.

Senate 
There were 8 resignations, 2 deaths, 1 interim appointment, and 1 vacancy from before this Congress.

|-
| Ohio(3)
| Vacant
| Edward Tiffin (DR) resigned at the end of the previous Congress.Successor was appointed to continue the term.
|  | Stanley Griswold (DR)
| Seated May 18, 1809

|-
| New Jersey(2)
|  | Aaron Kitchell (DR)
| Resigned March 12, 1809.Successor was appointed to continue the term and subsequently elected to finish the term.
|  | John Condit (DR)
| Seated March 21, 1809

|-
| Tennessee(2)
|  | Daniel Smith (DR)
| Resigned March 31, 1809.Successor was elected April 11, 1809 to finish the term.
|  | Jenkin Whiteside (DR)
| Seated April 11, 1809

|-
| Rhode Island(1)
|  | Francis Malbone (F)
| Died June 4, 1809.Successor was elected to finish the term.
|  | Christopher G. Champlin (F)
| Seated June 26, 1809

|-
| Delaware(1)
|  | Samuel White (F)
| Died November 4, 1809.Successor was appointed to continue the term and subsequently elected to finish the term.
|  | Outerbridge Horsey (F)
| Seated January 12, 1810

|-
| Georgia(3)
|  | John Milledge (DR)
| Resigned November 14, 1809.Successor was elected to finish the term.
|  | Charles Tait (DR)
| Seated November 27, 1809

|-
| Ohio(3)
|  | Stanley Griswold (DR)
| Appointee was not elected to finish the term.Successor elected December 11, 1809.
|  | Alexander Campbell (DR)
| Seated December 11, 1809

|-
| Kentucky(2)
|  | Buckner Thruston (DR)
| Appointed judge of the US District Court of the District of Columbia December 18, 1809
|  | Henry Clay (DR)
| Seated November 4, 1810

|-
| New Hampshire(3)
|  | Nahum Parker (DR)
| Resigned June 1, 1810
|  | Charles Cutts (F)
| Seated June 21, 1810

|-
| Connecticut(1)
|  | James Hillhouse (F)
| Resigned June 10, 1810
|  | Samuel W. Dana (F)
| Seated December 4, 1810

|-
| Ohio(1)
|  | Return J. Meigs Jr. (DR)
| Resigned on or before December 10, 1810, to become Governor of Ohio
|  | Thomas Worthington (DR)
| Seated December 15, 1810

|-
| South Carolina(2)
|  | Thomas Sumter (DR)
| Resigned December 16, 1810
|  | John Taylor (DR)
| Seated December 31, 1810

|}

House of Representatives
Of the voting members, there were 12 resignations, 1 death, and 1 change due to a contested election.

|-
| 
| Vacant
| failure to elect
| Jonathan Jennings
| Seated November 27, 1809

|-
| 
|  | Benjamin Say (DR)
| Resigned June, 1809
|  | Adam Seybert (DR)
| Seated October 10, 1809

|-
| 
|  | William Baylies (F)
| Lost contested election June 28, 1809
|  | Charles Turner Jr. (DR)
| June 28, 1809

|-
| 
|  | Wilson C. Nicholas (DR)
| Resigned November 27, 1809
|  | David S. Garland (DR)
| Seated January 17, 1810

|-
| 
|  | John Brown (DR)
| Resigned sometime in 1810
|  | Robert Wright (DR)
| Seated November 29, 1810

|-
| 
|  | Jabez Upham (F)
| Resigned sometime in 1810
|  | Joseph Allen (F)
| October 8, 1810

|-
| 
|  | William Denning (DR)
| Resigned sometime in 1810
|  | Samuel L. Mitchill (DR)
| December 4, 1810

|-
| 
|  | Benjamin Howard (DR)
| Resigned April 10, 1810, after becoming Governor of Louisiana Territory
|  | William T. Barry (DR)
| Seated August 8, 1810

|-
| 
|  | Samuel W. Dana (F)
| Resigned May 10, 1810, after being elected to US Senate
|  | Ebenezer Huntington (F)
| October 11, 1810

|-
| 
|  | Roger Nelson (DR)
| Resigned May 14, 1810
|  | Samuel Ringgold (DR)
| Seated October 15, 1810

|-
| 
|  | William Stedman (F)
| Resigned July 16, 1810
|  | Abijah Bigelow (F)
| October 8, 1810

|-
| 
|  | James Cox (DR)
| Died September 12, 1810
|  | John A. Scudder (DR)
| Seated October 31, 1810

|-
| 
|  | John G. Jackson (DR)
| Resigned September 28, 1810
|  | William McKinley (DR)
| Seated December 21, 1810

|-
| 
|  | Robert Marion (DR)
| Resigned December 4, 1810
|  | Langdon Cheves (DR)
| Seated December 31, 1810

|-
| 
|  | John Taylor (DR)
| Resigned December 30, 1810, after becoming US Senator
| Vacant
| Not filled for remainder of term
|}

Committees
Lists of committees and their party leaders.

Senate

 Audit and Control the Contingent Expenses of the Senate (Chairman: N/A)
 Engrossed Bills (Chairman: Nicholas Gilman)
 National University (Chairman: N/A)
 Whole

House of Representatives

 Accounts (Chairman: Nicholas R. Moore then William Milnor then Nicholas R. Moore)
 Arms Exports (Select) 
 Claims (Chairman: Richard M. Johnson then Erastus Root)
 Commerce and Manufactures (Chairman: Thomas Newton Jr.)
 District of Columbia (Chairman: John Love then Archibald Van Horne)
 Elections (Chairman: William Findley)
 Post Office and Post Roads (Chairman: John Rhea)
 Public Lands (Chairman: Jeremiah Morrow)
 Revisal and Unfinished Business (Chairman: Henry Southard)
 Rules (Select) 
 Standards of Official Conduct 
 Ways and Means (Chairman: John W. Eppes)
 Whole

Joint committees

 Enrolled Bills (Chairman: James Turner)
 The Library (Chairman: N/A)

Employees

Legislative branch agency directors 
 Architect of the Capitol: Benjamin Latrobe
 Librarian of Congress: Patrick Magruder

Senate
 Chaplain: James J. Wilmer (Episcopalian), until December 5, 1809
 Obadiah B. Brown (Baptist), from December 5, 1809
 Walter D. Addison (Episcopalian), from December 12, 1810
 Secretary: Samuel A. Otis
 Sergeant at Arms: James Mathers

House of Representatives
 Chaplain: Robert Elliott, Baptist, until May 27, 1809
 Jesse Lee, Methodist, from May 27, 1809
 Clerk: Patrick Magruder
 Doorkeeper: Thomas Claxton
 Reading Clerks: 
 Sergeant at Arms: Thomas Dunn

See also 
 1808 United States elections (elections leading to this Congress)
 1808 United States presidential election
 1808–09 United States Senate elections
 1808–09 United States House of Representatives elections
 1810 United States elections (elections during this Congress, leading to the next Congress)
 1810–11 United States Senate elections
 1810–11 United States House of Representatives elections

Notes

References

External links
 Statutes at Large, 1789-1875
 Senate Journal, First Forty-three Sessions of Congress
 House Journal, First Forty-three Sessions of Congress
 Biographical Directory of the U.S. Congress
 U.S. House of Representatives: House History
 U.S. Senate: Statistics and Lists